The Institute of National Studies is an institute located in Tiaret, Algeria. Its library holds 25,000 volumes.

References 

Educational organisations based in Algeria